The 2002 Michigan Senate elections were held November 5, 2002, with partisan primaries to select the parties' nominees in the various districts on August 6, 2002.

Results

Districts 1-9

Districts 10-19

Districts 20-29

Districts 30-38

See also
Michigan House of Representatives election, 2002

References

2002 Michigan elections
Michigan Senate elections
Michigan Senate
November 2002 events in the United States